Miguel Solís Pérez (1906 – death date unknown) was an American baseball infielder in the Cuban League and Negro league baseball. He played professionally from 1927 to 1940, mostly with the Cuban Stars (East) and Cuban Stars (West).

References

External links
 and Baseball-Reference Black Baseball stats and Seamheads

1906 births
Year of death unknown
Cuban Stars (East) players
Cuban Stars (West) players
New York Cubans players
Baseball infielders
Baseball players from Havana